Rebekah Elizabeth Gee (born December 4, 1975) is an American physician and public health policy expert who is Founder and CEO of Nest Health and served as the secretary of the Louisiana Department of Health from 2016 to 2020. As Secretary, Gee led the expansion of Medicaid.  Prior to her role as secretary, Gee led a variety of quality improvement efforts at the state and national levels.

Early life and education 
Gee was born in Bountiful, Utah, she is the daughter of Elizabeth (née Dutson) and E. Gordon Gee. Her father is a prominent American academic, currently serving his second term as president of West Virginia University; he has served as the chief executive at several universities in the United States, including the Ohio State University, Vanderbilt University, Brown University, and the University of Colorado. Gee is the parent of five children and mother of identical twins and lives in New Orleans.

Gee attended Columbia College, graduating with a Bachelor of Arts in American History in 1997. She then received her Master of Public Health from the Mailman School of Public Health at Columbia University in 1998, focused in Health Policy and Management. Gee went on to earn her medical degree from the Weill Medical College of Cornell University in 2002, completing her residency in obstetrics and gynecology through Harvard Medical School's Brigham and Women's Hospital and Massachusetts General Hospital in 2006. Gee was a Robert Wood Johnson Clinical Scholar at the University of Pennsylvania and in 2009, Gee obtained her Master of Science in Health Policy Research from the Perelman School of Medicine at the University of Pennsylvania. Gee is board certified in Obstetrics and Gynecology.

Career 

Gee is an Obstetrician/Gynecologist and Founder and CEO of Nest Health.  Nest Health has been recognized as one of ten most promising hybrid health care companies and one of 150 most promising digital healthcare companies in the world by CB insights. From 2020-2022, Gee was CEO of Health Care Services for Louisiana State University. From 2016–2020, she served as Secretary of the Louisiana Department of Health, the state’s largest agency with an annual budget of approximately $14 billion. While Secretary, Gee oversaw the implementation of Medicaid expansion which has extended health insurance coverage to over 600,000 Louisianans. Gee is a trained health services researcher who has used data and dashboards to communicate the impact of policy change including a dashboard demonstrating the impact of Medicaid expansion on coverage and access to primary and preventive services, a Hepatitis C treatment dashboard and a statewide Opioid response dashboard.

Gee developed a first in the nation elimination campaign for Hepatitis C spearheaded by her teams' successful drug-pricing negotiations that is now being used as a national model by the Biden administration. She has led national policy discussions on the creation of affordable pharmaceuticals. As a result of this novel drug pricing arrangement and a companion public health strategy, in the first year, four times the number of people have been treated for this deadly disease. As Secretary, she eliminated a decades-long waitlist for individuals and families needing disability services by tailoring waiver services to recipient needs. Gee implemented an aggressive statewide opioid response plan and dashboard, along with her statewide standing order for Naloxone, which has been used by thousands of Louisianans. Gee often speaks about the importance of health equity and created the South’s first Office of Health Equity in a state department of health. She also spearheaded the creation of an initiative to eliminate disparities in breast and colon cancer: Taking Aim At Cancer in Louisiana.

Gee is a Full Professor (gratis) at LSU's School of Public Health, previously tenured, and has an extensive background in quality improvement, and a policy expert and widely published health services researcher. Throughout her career, she has been a consistent voice for maternal safety and quality. Gee served on the healthcare transition team for President-elect Barack Obama and served as a co-chair for Vice President Joe Biden's health policy campaign team. Before her time as Secretary, Gee served as the Medicaid Medical Director for Louisiana Medicaid. She previously served as the director for a statewide Birth Outcomes Initiative for Republican Governor Bobby Jinidal and led the charge to decrease infant mortality and prematurity statewide. Her initiative resulted in a 25% reduction in infant mortality, an 85% drop in elective deliveries before 39 weeks, and a 10% drop in NICU admissions statewide. Gee’s efforts while Secretary focused on maternal morbidity and mortality and the efforts of the Reducing Maternal Morbidity Initiative, which Dr. Gee launched, have led to a 39% reduction in complications due to heavy bleeding—the leading preventable cause of maternal death in Louisiana.

Dr. Gee serves on the advisory board for a number of non-profits including the Institute for Healthcare Improvement, the University of Pennsylvania Center for Health Incentives and Behavioral Economics, the Duke Margolis Center, the National Academy of Medicine's Culture of Health Program and chairs the selection of fellows for the National Academy of Medicine anniversary fellows program. Gee also serves on the Healthcare Advisory board for SelectQuote. 

Gee was elected to the National Academy of Medicine in 2017, was recognized by the New York Times as one of Five Who Spread Hope in 2019, and was recognized by Modern Healthcare as one of 2019's Women Leaders to Watch in Healthcare.

Publications

Journal publications (referred)

 Women's Health Research: Progress, Pitfalls, and Promise.  Institute of Medicine.  The National Academies Press. 2010. https://www.nap.edu/catalog/12908/womens-health-research-progress-pitfalls-and-promise
 Clinical Preventive Services for Women: Closing the Gaps. Institute of Medicine.  The National Academies Press. 2011.http://www.nationalacademies.org/hmd/Reports/2011/Clinical-Preventive-Services-for-Women-Closing-the-Gaps.aspx

 Gordon PV, Gee RE. High Flow Nasal Cannula Use Correlates with Improved Outcomes in the Louisiana Neonatal Quality Improvement Collaborative (LNQIC). e-Journal of Neonatology Research Volume 2, Issue 3, Summer 2012.

Journal publications (non-referred)

References 

1975 births
American gynecologists
American obstetricians
American public health doctors
American women physicians
Columbia College (New York) alumni
Cornell University alumni
Living people
People from Bountiful, Utah
State cabinet secretaries of Louisiana
University of Pennsylvania alumni
Women gynaecologists
21st-century American women
Members of the National Academy of Medicine
Women public health doctors